Steve Marshall (born October 26, 1964) is an American lawyer serving as the 48th attorney general of Alabama, having been appointed in February 2017 by Governor Robert J. Bentley to fill the vacancy created by previous attorney general Luther Strange's appointment to the United States Senate. He was elected to a full term in 2018, and was re-elected in 2022. He previously served as district attorney in Marshall County for 16 years.

Early life and education
Marshall was born in Atmore, Alabama, the only child of Conrad Marshall, a representative for a sporting goods manufacturer, and Mary Jo Marshall, a secretary. He graduated from Pinecrest High School in Southern Pines, North Carolina, and earned a bachelor's degree in American studies from the University of North Carolina at Chapel Hill in 1987. He then earned a J.D. degree at the University of Alabama School of Law, and was admitted to the Alabama State Bar in 1990.

Career

Law
Marshall practiced law in Birmingham and Montgomery in the firm of Maynard Cooper and Gale P.C. and then moved to Guntersville where he started the firm of McLaughlin & Marshall. He was district representative for Alabama and Georgia in the American Bar Association. In addition to private practice, he served as a legal analyst for the Alabama House of Representatives, as prosecutor for the Arab and Albertville municipal courts and as municipal attorney for Arab.

Marshall County district attorney
In 2001, on the retirement of Ronald Thompson, he was appointed District Attorney for Marshall County by Governor Don Siegelman, the second youngest district attorney in the state at the time. Marshall was unopposed in three subsequent elections. As district attorney, he assisted in passage of the Brody Act, which makes injury to a fetus an offense punishable in addition to any injury to the mother, and of a state law requiring a driver's license for the purchase of ephedrine and pseudoephedrine, ingredients used in manufacturing crystal meth.

Attorney General of Alabama
Marshall was appointed Attorney General of Alabama by Governor Robert J. Bentley in February 2017, to fill the vacancy caused by Luther Strange's appointment to the United States Senate. He was elected to a full term in 2018, defeating former attorney general Troy King in a July run-off election.

In August 2017, after Birmingham mayor William A. Bell draped a Confederate memorial with plastic and surrounded it with plywood with the rationale "This country should in no way tolerate the hatred that the KKK, neo-Nazis, fascists and other hate groups spew", Marshall sued Bell and the city for violating the Alabama Memorial Preservation Act, which prohibits the "relocation, removal, alteration, or other disturbance of any monument on public property that has been in place for 40 years or more".

In July 2017, Texas attorney general Ken Paxton led a group of Republican attorneys general from nine other states, including Steve Marshall, plus Idaho governor Butch Otter, in threatening the Donald Trump administration that they would litigate if the president did not terminate the Deferred Action for Childhood Arrivals (DACA) policy that had been put into place by President Barack Obama. Tennessee attorney general Herbert Slatery subsequently reversed his position.

In 2018, Marshall's opponent, Troy King, accused him of violating campaign finance laws by accepting money from a banned political action committee.

In 2019, attorneys general from all 50 U.S. states, the District of Columbia, and all four U.S. territories were urged by the National Association of Attorneys General to support a bill, the Secure and Fair Enforcement (SAFE) Banking Act (H.R. 1595), sponsored by U.S. representative Ed Perlmutter (D-Colo.), which would permit marijuana-related businesses in states and territories to use the banking system. The bill would facilitate collection of taxes levied on the $8.3 billion industry, reduce the danger of operating cash-only businesses and more effectively monitor the industry. Only Marshall and 16 other attorneys general did not support the measure.

In June 2020, Marshall threatened to prosecute the city of Mobile and levy a $25,000 fine for removing the confederate memorial Statue of Raphael Semmes during George Floyd protests, if the removal became permanent.

Marshall is co-chair of Alabama governor Kay Ivey's Opioid Overdose and Addiction Council.

In October 2020, Marshall successfully led a challenge to the Supreme Court of the United States which struck down a federal court-order allowing curb-side voting in Alabama as an accommodation for voters worried about contracting COVID-19.

Marshall declined to throw out the conviction of death row inmate Toforest Johnson despite a dearth of evidence of his guilt and widespread support by legal scholars to throw out the conviction. A Jefferson County conviction integrity unit flagged Johnson's case, leading the county's district attorney to recommend that Johnson be given a new trial. Former Alabama Supreme Court Chief Justice Drayton Nabers, Jr. and former Alabama Attorney General Bill Baxley called for throwing out the conviction.

In March 2022, Marshall created controversy by refusing to acknowledge Joe Biden as the "duly elected and lawfully serving" President of the United States during the Senate confirmation hearings on the nomination of Ketanji Brown Jackson to the Supreme Court.

Rule of Law Defense Fund 
Marshall leads the Rule of Law Defense Fund, a nonprofit under the Republican Attorneys General Association. The organization organized pro-Trump protests on January 6, 2021, which sought to overturn the 2020 election, which Trump lost to Joe Biden. Trump and his allies made false and baseless claims of fraud. The protests preceded pro-Trump rioters attacking the U.S. Capitol.

Political party affiliation
In 2011, after serving for ten years as Marshall County district attorney, Marshall officially changed his political party affiliation from the Democratic Party to the Republican Party.

Personal life
Marshall is an elder at LifePoint Church in Albertville and has participated in missionary work in India. He was married to Bridgette Gentry, who took her own life on June 24, 2018, after "a long struggle with mental illness" and addictions. They have a daughter together.

References

External links

|-

1964 births
20th-century American lawyers
21st-century American lawyers
21st-century American politicians
Alabama Attorneys General
Alabama Democrats
Alabama Republicans
District attorneys in Alabama
Living people
People from Marshall County, Alabama
University of Alabama School of Law alumni
University of North Carolina alumni